Anna Rakel Pétursdóttir (born 24 August 1998) is an Icelandic footballer who plays as a defender for Valur and the Iceland national team. She had previously played for Linköpings FC and the Icelandic club Þór/KA.

Club career
In December 2018 Anna Rakel signed a two-year professional contract with Swedish Damallsvenskan club Linköpings FC. She agreed a transfer to newly-promoted Damallsvenskan club IK Uppsala in December 2019, signing a one-year contract.

International career
Anna Rakel made her senior debut for the Iceland national team in January 2018, playing in a 2–1 friendly defeat by Norway at La Manga Club.

Honours 
Þór/KA
Winner
 Úrvalsdeild: 2017
 Icelandic Women's Super Cup: 2018

References

External links 

 
 

1998 births
Living people
Anna Rakel Petursdottir
Anna Rakel Petursdottir
Anna Rakel Petursdottir
Damallsvenskan players
Expatriate women's footballers in Sweden
Women's association football defenders
Anna Rakel Petursdottir
Linköpings FC players
IK Uppsala Fotboll players